Olivier Klein (born 16 February 1967) is a French politician currently serving as Minister Delegate of Cities and Housing in the Borne government.

References

See also 

 Borne government

1967 births
Living people
Socialist Party (France) politicians
French Ministers of Cities
French Ministers of Housing
21st-century French politicians
French people of Hungarian-Jewish descent
Jewish French politicians
Members of the Borne government
Mayors of places in Île-de-France